Ursula Grabley (8 December 1908 – 3 April 1977) was a German actress. She appeared in more than 80 films and television shows between 1929 and 1977.

Selected filmography

 Katharina Knie (1929)
 The Concert (1931)
 That's All That Matters (1931)
 The Black Hussar (1932)
 Spell of the Looking Glass (1932)
 The Golden Anchor (1932)
 Voices of Spring (1933)
 The Marathon Runner (1933)
 Scandal in Budapest (1933)
 Bashful Felix (1934)
 At the Strasbourg (1934)
 Annette in Paradise (1934)
 Make Me Happy (1935)
 The Call of the Jungle (1936)
 Ride to Freedom (1937)
The Chief Witness (1937)
 A Girl from the Chorus (1937)
 The Impossible Mister Pitt (1938)
 Hurrah! I'm a Father (1939)
 Twilight (1940)
 Anna Alt (1945)
 Under the Bridges (1946)
 Blondes for Export (1950)
 The Colourful Dream (1952)
 They Call It Love (1953)
 Confession Under Four Eyes (1954)
 Mamitschka (1955)
 Father's Day (1955)
 Without You All Is Darkness (1956)
 The Night Before the Premiere (1959)
 Heaven, Love and Twine (1960)
 Zur Hölle mit den Paukern (1968)

References

External links
 
 

1908 births
1977 deaths
People from Oder-Spree
People from the Province of Brandenburg
German film actresses
20th-century German actresses